The Lubrański Academy (Polish: Akademia Lubrańskiego; Latin: Collegium Lubranscianum) was a university college that was established in 1518 in Poznań by Bishop Jan Lubrański. It was the first school with university aspirations in Poznań (in fact it was not a full university).

History
The academy's first rector was the Poznań humanist Tomasz Bederman.  Another prominent lecturer was Grzegorz of Szamotuły.

The Lubrański Academy aimed at independence from the Kraków Academy but was finally transformed into a faculty of the Kraków Academy. Before that the Lubrański Academy comprised six schools: of philosophy, logic, mathematics, languages (Latin, Greek), law, and rhetoric.

The academy's main building was remodeled in the 17th and 18th centuries.

In 1780 the academy was merged with the Jesuit Collegium Posnaniae.

Today the Lubrański Academy's building holds the museum of the Roman Catholic Archdiocese of Poznań.

Alumni

Józef Struś - scientist, mayor of Poznań.
Klemens Janicki - poet
Łukasz Opaliński - poet and writer
Jan Śniadecki - astronomer and polymath

See also
Zamojski Academy
Scholars and Literati at the University of Lubranski College in Poznan (1519–1780), Repertorium Eruditorum Totius Europae – RETE

References
Encyklopedia Polski, p. 12.
 K. Mazurkiewicz, Początki Akademji Lubrańskiego w Poznaniu (1519  - 1535). Przyczynek do dziejów rozwoju nauk humanistycznych w Polsce, Poznań 1921
 J. Nowacki, Akademia Lubrańskiego, Kronika Miasta Poznania 1999, nr 2
 M. Nowicki, Profil wychowawczy Akademii Lubrańskiego na tle sporu Krzysztofa Hegendorfera z Grzegorzem Szamotulczykiem, in Ku źródłom wartości, red. P. Orlik, Poznań 2008, pp. 327–334
 M. Nowicki, Vir orator czy vir probus, czyli problem recepcji antycznych wartości wychowawczych w programie wychowawczym Akademii Lubrańskiego, in Ku źródłom wartości, a cura di P. Orlik, Poznań 2008, pp. 313–326
 M. Nowicki, Stan badań nad dziejami Akademii Lubrańskiego, Biuletyn Historii Wychowania 24 (2008), pp. 107–120
 M. Nowicki, The educational activity of Lubrański Academy in 17th and 18th century, Poznań 2011
 L. Sieciechowiczowa, Życie codzienne w renesansowym Poznaniu 1518-1619, Warszawa 1974
 D. Żołądź-Strzelczyk, Academia Lubransciana, Kronika Miasta Poznania 1999, nr 2

1518 establishments in Poland
Defunct universities and colleges in Poland
Defunct schools in Poland
History of Poznań
Jagiellonian University
Universities and colleges in the Polish–Lithuanian Commonwealth
Buildings and structures in Poznań